Kharbatha al-Misbah is a Palestinian town in the central West Bank, located  west of Ramallah in the Ramallah and al-Bireh Governorate. According to the Palestinian Central Bureau of Statistics, the town had a population of 5,211 in 2007.  It has a total land area of 4,431 dunams, of which 644 are built-up areas and the remainder agricultural lands and forests.

Location
It is bordered by Beit Ur al Fauqa to the east, Beit Ur at Tahta  to the north, Beit Sira to the west, and Beit Liqya to the south.

History
In 1838, it was noted as a Muslim   village called Khurbata in the Lydda administrative region.

In 1863, Victor Guérin found the village to have 400 inhabitants, along with ruins identified in local tradition as the remains of a Christian church. He further noted five or six cisterns, and ancient tombs. Guérin thought that this was an ancient place that was founded on a Hebrew settlement whose original name had been lost.

Socin found from an official Ottoman  village list from about 1870 that the village, called Charabta, had a population of 194, with a total of 71  houses, though the population count included only men. Hartmann found that  Charabta had 78 houses.

In 1882, the PEF's Survey of Western Palestine described the village, then called Khurbetha ibn es Seba, as "a small village on a ridge, with a well to the east."

British Mandate era
In the 1922 census of Palestine, conducted by the British Mandate authorities, Kherbet al-Mesbah had a population of 369, all Muslim. In the 1931 census it had increased to a  population of 488, still all Muslim, in 121 inhabited houses.

In the 1945 statistics, the population of Khirbat el Misbah was 600, all  Muslims, who owned 4,438 dunams of land  according to an official land and population survey. 1,026 dunams were plantations and irrigable land, 2,133 used for cereals, while 25 dunams were built-up (urban) land.

Jordanian era
In the wake of the 1948 Arab–Israeli War, and after the 1949 Armistice Agreements, Kharbatha al-Misbah came  under Jordanian rule.

The Jordanian census of 1961 found 942 inhabitants in Kh. Misbah.

There are two mosques in the town: Omri Mosque and al-Kawthar Mosque. The former was built atop the ruins of an ancient church and was renovated in 1965. Within the town, still lay Ancient Roman cemeteries. It has been governed by a village council.

1967-present
Since the Six-Day War in 1967, Kharbatha al-Misbah has been under Israeli occupation.

After the 1995 accords, 19% of village land was classified as Area B, while the remaining 81% was classified as Area C. Israel has confiscated 61 dunams of village land in order to build the Israeli settlement of Beit Horon.

See also
Kharbatha Bani Harith

References

Bibliography

External links
Welcome to Kh. al-Misbah
Survey of Western Palestine, Map 17:  IAA, Wikimedia commons 
Kharbatha al Misbah Village (Fact Sheet),  Applied Research Institute–Jerusalem (ARIJ)
 Kharbatha al Misbah Village Profile, ARIJ
 Kharbatha aerial photo, ARIJ
 The Hardships Resulting From Blockading Villages In Ramallah District 18, January, 2001, Poica
 The Prohibition of Palestinian access on Israeli Bypass Road #443 16, December, 2007,  Poica
   A New Israeli Military Order to confiscate ten dunums of Beit Liqya lands southwest of Ramallah city 24, April, 2010, Poica
Tell me, kid, did you throw stones? Boys barely in their teens are being carted off by the army in the middle of the night and many tell of manhandling and beating by Amira Hass, Apr. 15, 2003, Haaretz

Towns in the West Bank
Municipalities of the State of Palestine